The National Association for Black Veterans  (NABVETS) is a nationally certified Veterans Service Organization and a United States Department of Veterans Affairs claims representative. NABVETS has membership and chapters throughout the United States and Puerto Rico, providing personal advocacy on behalf of veterans seeking claims against the United States Department of Veterans Affairs. NABVETS' mission includes advocacy for youth and families, community involvement to help create positive lifestyles for veterans, and the empowerment of low-income and minority veterans.  NABVET also works to generate and preserve the historical record.

References

External links
National Association for Black Veterans Home page

American veterans' organizations
1974 establishments in Wisconsin
Professional associations based in the United States
African-American professional organizations
Organizations established in 1974